Gindokhar is a village in Rewari Tehsil, Rewari district, of Haryana, India. The nearest railway station is Kishanghad Balawas Railway Station.

Lakhnor , Balawas Jamapur , Kishangarh , Bhudpur (2 km), Lisana  are the nearby villages to Gindokhar.

References

Villages in Rewari district